Roman Aleksandrovich Surnev (born 7 June 1981) is a former Russian professional football player.

Club career
He played 8 seasons in the Russian Football National League for 5 different clubs.

External links
 

1981 births
Sportspeople from Stavropol
Living people
Russian footballers
Association football midfielders
FC Dynamo Stavropol players
FC Salyut Belgorod players
FC Krasnodar players
FC Yenisey Krasnoyarsk players
FC Avangard Kursk players